The Young Runaways is a 1978 American made-for-television drama family film produced by Walt Disney Productions starring Gary Collins, Anne Francis, Sharon Farrell and Robert Webber. It originally aired on NBC as part of The Wonderful World of Disney on May 28, 1978.

Synopsis
"The Young Runaways" are a 12-year-old girl (Alicia Fleer) and her 5-year-old brother (Tommy Crebbs), while on a mission to "kidnap" their brother and sister from a foster home, accidentally become entangled with bank robbers (Anne Francis and Robert Webber) and a precocious, wealthy youngster eager to mastermind the caper.

Cast
Gary Collins as Lt. Ray Phillips
Anne Francis as Mrs. Lockhart
Sharon Farrell as Mamma Doyle
Robert Webber as Fred Lockhart
Alicia Fleer as Rosebud Doyle
Chip Courtland as Eric
Tommy Crebbs as Joseph T. Doyle
Pat Delany as Katherine
Sonny Shroyer as C.L. Doyle
Dick Bakalyan as Jocko
Howard T. Platt as Bubba
Walter Barnes as Sgt. Abel
Lucille Benson as Grandma Hopkinson
Jennifer Jason Leigh as Heather
Tim Pellegrino as Sam

Home video
To date, The Young Runaways has never been released on any physical format by Walt Disney Studios Home Entertainment.

References

External links

1978 television films
1978 films
1978 drama films
American drama television films
Films about children
Films produced by Ron W. Miller
Disney television films
Walt Disney anthology television series episodes
Films directed by Russ Mayberry
1970s American films
1970s English-language films